Clarkson Sherman Fisher (July 8, 1921 – July 27, 1997) was a United States district judge of the United States District Court for the District of New Jersey.

Education and career

Born in Long Branch, New Jersey, Fisher was a sergeant in the United States Army during World War II, from 1942 to 1945, and was a reserve sergeant from 1946 to 1949. He received a Bachelor of Laws from the Notre Dame Law School in 1950. He entered private practice in Long Branch from 1951 to 1964. He was a councilman in West Long Branch, New Jersey from 1959 to 1964, serving as a member of the New Jersey General Assembly in 1964. He was a judge of the Monmouth County Court in New Jersey from 1964 to 1966, and of the Superior Court of New Jersey from 1966 to 1970.

Federal judicial service

On October 7, 1970, Fisher was nominated by President Richard Nixon to a seat on the United States District Court for the District of New Jersey vacated by Judge Reynier Jacob Wortendyke Jr. Fisher was confirmed by the United States Senate on October 13, 1970, and received his commission on October 16, 1970. He served as Chief Judge from 1979 to 1987, assuming senior status on October 1, 1987. He served in that capacity until his death on July 27, 1997, in Princeton, New Jersey.

Family

Fisher's son, Clarkson S. Fisher, Jr., also is a judge, having served on the Superior Court of New Jersey since 1993, and on that court's Appellate Division since 2003.

Honor

The Clarkson S. Fisher Federal Building and United States Courthouse in Trenton, New Jersey is named in his honor.

References

Sources
 

1921 births
1997 deaths
Judges of the United States District Court for the District of New Jersey
Members of the New Jersey General Assembly
People from West Long Branch, New Jersey
Politicians from Monmouth County, New Jersey
United States district court judges appointed by Richard Nixon
20th-century American judges
United States Army non-commissioned officers
Notre Dame Law School alumni
20th-century American lawyers
20th-century American politicians
United States Army personnel of World War II